Sartène Town Hall is the Town Hall in Sartène, Southern Corsica, Corsica. The building is the subject of an inscription in respect of the historic monuments by decree of March 8, 1991.

References

Monuments historiques of Corsica
Buildings and structures in Corse-du-Sud